David N. Magang (born 1938) is a Botswana lawyer, businessman and politician. Trained at the University of London, he was the first Botswana native to open a private law practice in the nation. A member of the ruling Botswana Democratic Party Magang was Member of Parliament for Kweneng East/Lentsweletau Constituency from 1979 to 2002.

Magang was also Governor of the African Development Bank from 1989 to 1992.  After leaving government Magang became a successful property developer, creating the upper class Gaborone suburb of Phakalane. He wrote a successful and controversial 2008 autobiography The Magic of Perseverance. 

In 2012, American journalist, Peter Musurlian of Globalist Films, completed an Emmy-winning documentary on Botswana, which he shot in December 2002. David Magang was instrumental in many of the shoots in Botswana and he was featured throughout the film, which aired in Burbank, California and is available on YouTube.[external link needed]

Rankings 
He held a number of high-ranking ministry portfolios under presidents Quett Masire and Festus Mogae, including Minister of Mineral Resources and Water Affairs (1994–97) and Minister of Works, Transport & Communications (1992–94, 1998–2001).

Education 
Trained at the University of London.

Achievements 
After leaving government Magang became a successful property developer, creating the upper class Gaborone suburb of Phakalane. He wrote a successful and controversial 2008 autobiography The Magic of Perseverance.

References

 Fred Morton, Jeff Ramsay, Themba Mgadla. Historical dictionary of Botswana. 4th Edition. Scarecrow Press: 2008.  p. 204.
David Magang. The magic of perseverance: the autobiography of David Magang. Issue 51 of CASAS book series: 2008. 
 "Burbank's African Sister City" https://www.youtube.com/watch?v=GT_is8mFDOs
 www.globalistfilms.com

1938 births
Living people
Members of the National Assembly (Botswana)
Alumni of the University of London
Botswana Democratic Party politicians